The Old Delhi–Meerut–Saharanpur line is a railway line connecting  and  via Meerut with includes the – link. The line is under the administrative jurisdiction of Northern Railway and Delhi division.

History

Infrastructure works

Electrification
As of 12-03-2016, the Old Delhi–Meerut–Saharanpur line including the –Meerut–Saharanpur sector are electrified. Trains can now seamlessly run with electric locomotives from Delhi to Haridwar and Delhi to Ambala via Meerut and Saharanpur.

Double line 
Delhi–Meerut–Saharanpur section is double track. In 1977 doubling of Ghaziabad–Muradnagar section was completed. Doubling of Muradnagar–Meerut section was completed in 2000. Meerut–-Daurala section was doubled on 13 August 2017. Daurala–Khatauli section was doubled on 19 Jan 2018. Khatauli–Muzaffarnagar section was doubled on 22 May 2019. 
Muzaffarnagar–Deoband section was doubled on 6 March 2020. Deoband– was doubled on 23 Dec 2020.

Loco shed

Ghaziabad electric loco shed serves the Delhi area. It housed 47 WAP-1 locos in 2008. It also has WAM-4, WAP-4, WAP-5, WAP-7 and WAG-5HA locos.

References

5 ft 6 in gauge railways in India
Railway lines in Uttar Pradesh
Railway lines opened in 1870

1870 establishments in India
Transport in Delhi
Transport in Meerut
Transport in Saharanpur